The Dying Detective may refer to:

"The Adventure of the Dying Detective", in some editions simply titled "The Dying Detective", one of the 56 Sherlock Holmes short stories
The Dying Detective (film), a 1921 short film directed by Maurice Elvey based on the short story